In Milton Lumky Territory is a realist, non-science fiction novel authored by Philip K. Dick. Originally written in 1958, but rejected by prospective publishers, this book was eventually published posthumously in 1985 by Dragon Press. It was published in two editions. Fifty copies were bound in quarter leather and included a signature from one of the author's canceled checks but were not jacketed. Nine hundred fifty copies were published with a cloth binding and included a dust jacket. It was reprinted in paperback in 2006.

Plot summary
It's 1958 and Bruce Stevens is a buyer for a national warehouse chain who passes through his hometown of Montario, Idaho whilst en route to Boise on business. His reason involves hormones more than nostalgia, however, as a one-time girlfriend named Peg lives there now. It is at a party at her place where he meets, and quickly falls into a relationship with, a strangely familiar older woman who turns out to be one of his former, and least favorite, elementary school teachers, Susan Faine. She simultaneously hires him on as manager of her typewriter shop. Travelling salesman Milton Lumky informs Bruce of a warehouse full of imported, Japanese-made surplus typewriters, and so Stevens drives to Seattle to see this potential bounty for himself. He belatedly discovers that the typewriters all have Spanish language keyboards, and so he tries to pass these hot potatoes down along the line to his former warehouse employer. He reveals his nefarious intentions to Susan, who passes the information onto the warehouse chain which nevertheless decides to take them off his hands at a fair but unprofitable price for Bruce. He then enters a period of waffling and indecision, ultimately deciding to try altering all of the machines himself and selling them at the shop. Returning to Boise he informs Susan of his decision and sets to work, only to return the next morning to find that Susan has fired him and all of the typewriters are being loaded into a truck by one of his former co-workers at the warehouse chain. Distraught by this turn of events he rents a room and recalls one of his first encounters with Susan as his fifth grade teacher which evolves into a day dream about the pair opening up shop in Montario and ultimately moving to Denver following the purchase of an expanded facility there and living happily ever after.

Sources

Andrew Butler: The Pocket Essential Philip K. Dick: Harpenden: Pocket Essentials: 2007: 

1985 American novels
Novels by Philip K. Dick
Novels published posthumously
Fiction set in 1958